Metaphosphatase may refer to:
 Endopolyphosphatase, an enzyme
 Exopolyphosphatase, an enzyme